The Kinmen-Matsu Joint Services Center  is the agency of the Executive Yuan serving as the local branch government governing Fujian Province which consists of Kinmen and Lienchiang Counties.

History
The agency was inaugurated on 17 January 2017 as a successor agency of Fujian Provincial Government in a ceremony officiated by Premier Lin Chuan in Kinmen.

Director
 Chang Ching-sen (17 January 2017–)

See also

 Fujian Province, Republic of China
 Fujian Province, People's Republic of China

References

External links
 

2017 establishments in Taiwan
Executive Yuan
Government agencies established in 2017
Jincheng Township
Organizations based in Kinmen County